Ali Raza may refer to:

 Ali Raza (cricketer, born 1974), Pakistani cricketer
 Ali Raza (cricketer, born 1977), Pakistani cricketer
 Ali Raza (cricketer, born 1981), Pakistani cricketer
 Ali Raza (cricketer, born 1987), Pakistani cricketer
 Ali Raza (field hockey) (born 1976), Pakistani Olympic hockey player
 Ali ar-Ridha, seventh descendant of the Islamic prophet Muhammad and the eighth of the Twelve Imams
 S. Ali Raza, Indian film screenwriter  and director